Harriet King may refer to:

 Harriet King (fencer) (born 1935), American Olympic fencer
 Harriet King (poet) (1840–1920), English poet